Vyšná Boca is a village and municipality in Liptovský Mikuláš District in the Žilina Region of northern Slovakia.

History
In historical records the village was first mentioned in 1262.

Geography
The municipality lies at an altitude of 953 metres and covers an area of  20.591 km². It has a population of about 102 people.

External links
https://web.archive.org/web/20080111223415/http://www.statistics.sk/mosmis/eng/run.html 

Villages and municipalities in Liptovský Mikuláš District